Overseas Taiwanese, also called "people of Taiwanese descent", are people of Taiwanese ancestry or descent who live or were born outside of Taiwan. Overseas Taiwanese may or may not be Taiwanese nationals.

Description

Taiwanese national identity

The Taiwanese national identity began to emerge in prominence during Japanese rule in Taiwan. Several organizations and political parties were founded within Taiwan during this period in order to advocate for Taiwan Independence, such as the Taiwan Cultural Association.

Following the Chinese annexation (reclamation) of Taiwan on 25 October 1945 after the 1943 Cairo Declaration, which is celebrated annually as "Retrocession Day", Taiwan has been claimed by the Republic of China. However, there is a strong case that Taiwan has actually never been incorporated into China's national territory and that Taiwan's current political status is "undetermined" but functions as its own nation ; this is contrasted against arguments that claim that Taiwan is a province of the Republic of China or a province of the People's Republic of China.

Since the end of martial law in Taiwan and the development of democratic multi-party elections under the political framework of the Republic of China, the political status of Taiwan has remained controversial. There exists within Taiwan a polarising "Blue/Green" political divide, wherein the Pan-Blue Coalition believes that Taiwan is (or should be) a province of a democratic China, whereas the Pan-Green Coalition believes that Taiwan is (or should be) an independent country based on a Taiwanese identity. Meanwhile, the People's Republic of China claims Taiwan as its own "Taiwan Province".

Early Taiwanese diaspora 
In 1895, Japan emerged victorious over China in the First Sino-Japanese War. As a result, the Treaty of Shimonoseki was signed. In this treaty, Japan outlined several of its demands, one of which was that the islands of Formosa and the Pescadores (i.e. Taiwan) should be transferred from Chinese sovereignty to Japanese sovereignty. Following the signing of the treaty, the Chinese Government abandoned Taiwan and permitted a Japanese seizure of Taiwan. A short-lived republic was established on the island in 1895, in order to deter a Japanese invasion and annexation of Taiwan, but it was defeated in the same year, and the island of Taiwan was then absorbed into Japan. 

Within the Treaty of Shimonoseki, it was agreed that the inhabitants of Taiwan would be permitted to sell their property and leave the island within a two-year period from 1895 until 1897. A minuscule percentage of the population of Taiwan opted to return to China, and an unknown number fled as refugees to other countries in the Asia-Pacific Region, such as the Netherlands East Indies (Indonesia). Those Taiwanese who remained on the island were, by the terms of the treaty, deemed to be Japanese subjects. They would later lose their Japanese nationality in 1952 with the signing of the Treaty of Taipei between Japan and the Republic of China in Taiwan. However, the legitimacy of the treaty is disputed.

Travel between China and Japanese Taiwan was possible. The small number of Taiwanese people living in China were re-absorbed into Chinese culture, though some became advocates of Chinese Unification. It is known that members of the early Taiwanese Communist Party were closely affiliated with the Chinese Communist Party prior to the establishment of the People's Republic of China in 1949. The failed Taiwanese Communist Party would later evolve into the Taiwan Democratic Self-Government League, one of eight officially-recognised political parties within the People's Republic of China which is ultimately subservient to the Chinese Communist Party. Many members of this party have been Taiwanese people residing in China.

During World War II, roughly 600 Taiwanese people living in the Netherlands East Indies (NEI) were arrested on the basis of their Japanese nationality or other links to the Japanese empire. Because the NEI government suspected that they would support the Japanese invasion of Indonesia or might provide the Imperial Japanese Army with sensitive information, the ~600 Taiwanese prisoners were deported to Australia in December 1941, and they were interned in Australia until March 1946. Several Taiwanese (Indonesian) children were born in Australia during the period of internment, receiving Australian citizenship at birth, and effectively creating a new "Taiwanese Australian" community. Taiwanese people had previously had a very minor presence in Australia.

Laws regarding overseas Taiwanese citizens
Overseas citizens must return to Taiwan to legally vote in elections, as Taiwan does not use absentee ballots.

Taiwanese in North America (US, Canada)
In the United States, there are 230,382 to 919,000 people of Taiwanese descent living in the country. They are mostly concentrated in California, New York, and Texas. There are over 91,000 Taiwanese people in Canada, mainly living in the provinces of British Columbia and Ontario.

See also
 Taishang, the predominant Taiwanese population group in mainland China
 Taiwanese people
 Han Taiwanese, descendants of Han Chinese people
 Austronesian people, descendants of Taiwanese aborigines in the Pacific and Southeast Asia

References

 
Asian diasporas